The 19107 / 19108 Bhavnagar Terminus–Udhampur Janmabhoomi Express is an Express train belonging to Western Railway zone that runs between  of Gujarat and  of Jammu and Kashmir in India.

It is currently being operated with 19107/19108 train numbers on a weekly basis.

Service

 19107/ Bhavnagar Terminus–Udhampur Janmabhoomi Express has an average speed of 50 km/hr and covers 1838 km in 36h 40m.
 19108/Udhampur–Bhavnagar Terminus Janmabhoomi Express has an average speed of 45 km/hr and covers 1838 km in 40h 25m.

Route and halts 

The important halts of the train are:

Coach composition

The train has standard LHB rakes with max speed of 110 kmph. The train consists of 22 coaches:

 2 AC II Tier
 6 AC III Tier
 8 Sleeper coaches
 4 General Unreserved
 2 End-on Generator

Traction

Both trains are hauled by a Sabarmati Loco Shed based WDP-4D diesel locomotive from Bhavnagar to Udhampur and vice versa.

Direction reversal

The train reverses its direction 3 times:

See also 

 Udhampur railway station
 Ahmedabad Junction railway station
 Bhavnagar Terminus railway station
 Janmabhoomi Express
 Gandhinagar Capital–Bhavnagar Terminus Intercity Express

Notes

References

External links 

 19107/Bhavnagar Terminus - Udhampur Janmabhoomi Express
 19108/Udhampur - Bhavnagar Terminus Janmabhoomi Express

Transport in Bhavnagar
Transport in Udhampur
Express trains in India
Rail transport in Rajasthan
Rail transport in Gujarat
Rail transport in Punjab, India
Rail transport in Jammu and Kashmir
Railway services introduced in 2011
Named passenger trains of India